A sole survivor is a person who is the only survivor of a deadly incident.

Sole Survivor may refer to:

Film and television
 Sole Survivor (1970 film), an American television film starring Vince Edwards, Richard Basehart and William Shatner
 Sole Survivor (1984 film), an American horror film by Thom Eberhardt
 Sole Survivor (2000 film), an American television film based on the 1997 novel of the same title by Dean Koontz (see below)
 Sole Survivor (2013 film), an American documentary film
 Sole Survivor, a title conferred on any winner of the reality television show Survivor

Other media
 Sole Survivor (novel), a 1997 novel by Dean Koontz
 "Sole Survivor" (Asia song)
 "Sole Survivor" (Helloween song)
 "Sole Survivor", a song by Blue Öyster Cult from Fire of Unknown Origin
 Command & Conquer: Sole Survivor, a computer game in the Command & Conquer: Tiberian series
 The player character in Fallout 4 is canonically referred to as the Sole Survivor

See also

 Sole Survivor Policy, a United States military policy
 Lone Survivor (disambiguation)
 List of sole survivors of aviation accidents and incidents
 Endling, a sole survivor of a species
 
 Surviving (disambiguation)
 Survivor (disambiguation)
 Sole (disambiguation)